The 2022 Jordan International Tournament was a football tournament for the national teams of Jordan, Syria, Iraq and Oman, which took place during the September 2022 window of the FIFA International Match Calendar.

Jordan won the tournament by defeating Oman 1–0 in the final.

Squads

Jordan

Syria

Iraq

Oman

Matches

Semi-finals

Third place match

Final

Winners

Top goalscorers
2 goals
 Aymen Hussein

1 goal
 Yazan Al-Naimat
 Ihsan Haddad
 Ahmed Samir
 Omar Al-Malki

References

External links
2022 Jordan International Tournament on Goalzz

2022
Jordan International Tournament
Jordan International Tournament
Jordan International Tournament
International men's association football invitational tournaments
Sport in Amman